Captain James Cook is a 1986 Australian mini series about the life of James Cook (1728-1779), a British explorer, navigator, cartographer, and captain in the British Royal Navy.

The series was financed by $5 million from Revcom France, $2.25 million from the ABC and the rest from 10BA tax money.

Cast

 Keith Michell - James Cook
 John Gregg - Joseph Banks
 Erich Hallhuber - Lt. Gore
 Peter Carroll - Solander
 Barry Quin - Lt. Hicks
 Fernando Rey - Hawke
 Carol Drinkwater - Elizabeth
 Geoff Morrell - Perry

References

External links
Captain James Cook at IMDb

Australian Broadcasting Corporation original programming
Australian adventure television series
1980s Australian television miniseries
English-language television shows
Seafaring films based on actual events
Sea adventure films
1987 Australian television series debuts
1987 Australian television series endings
Cultural depictions of James Cook